"Weight Loss" is the collective name for the first and second episodes of the fifth season of the American comedy television series The Office, and the show's 73rd and 74th episodes overall. Written by Lee Eisenberg and Gene Stupnitsky, and directed by Paul Feig, the episode first aired as a single 60 minute show in the United States on September 25, 2008 on NBC. "Weight Loss" guest stars Amy Ryan as Holly Flax, Dale Raoul as Ronni, and Rich Sommer as Alex.

The series—presented as if it were a real documentary—depicts the everyday lives of office employees in the Scranton, Pennsylvania, branch of the fictional Dunder Mifflin Paper Company. In this episode, the whole office participates in a company-wide weight loss contest. Pam (Jenna Fischer) is in New York City for art school, which causes her and Jim to have to adjust to being temporarily apart. An awkward tension between Michael (Steve Carell) and Holly (Amy Ryan) develops after she accepts a date with another man. Meanwhile, Angela (Angela Kinsey) and Dwight (Rainn Wilson) continue their secret relationship despite Angela's upcoming wedding to Andy.

Plot

The office partakes in a company-wide weight loss competition, with the prize of extra vacation days for the winning branch. Initially enthusiastic, the staff become over-competitive, especially Kelly Kapoor (Mindy Kaling) who stops eating and tries numerous diets, eventually passing out during one weigh-in. She buys what she believes is a tapeworm from Creed Bratton (Creed Bratton) as another measure, but Creed privately admits that it "wasn't a tapeworm." After Dwight Schrute (Rainn Wilson) abandons Phyllis Vance (Phyllis Smith) miles away from the office with no phone or money to force her to exercise, corporate responds with a memo that staff should not resort to drastic weight loss measures. The Scranton branch ends up losing the competition, although Stanley Hudson (Leslie David Baker) is proud of his individual results, and decides to take the vacation anyway.

Pam Beesly (Jenna Fischer) begins a three-month graphic design class in New York City. Wanting to see her, Jim Halpert (John Krasinski) meets Pam for lunch at an interstate rest stop between Scranton and New York City. He proposes to her outside in the pouring rain, and she accepts ecstatically.

Plotting his return to the company, Ryan Howard (B. J. Novak) apologizes to various people around the office for his past behavior, while keeping a list of people who wrong him to take revenge on them when he's back on top. Most notably, he apologizes to, and then proceeds to ask his former girlfriend Kelly Kapoor (Mindy Kaling) out, only to be rejected when she tells him that she is dating Darryl Philbin (Craig Robinson).

Holly Flax (Amy Ryan) yells at Angela Martin (Angela Kinsey) for chastising Kevin Malone (Brian Baumgartner), still believing he is mentally challenged. He awkwardly reveals he is "not retarded", and an embarrassed Holly apologizes and walks away. Holly continues to show interest in Michael Scott (Steve Carell), who now sports a goatee, until she catches him talking to a pregnant Jan Levinson (Melora Hardin). Holly then goes out on a date with Oscar's yoga instructor, and buys Counting Crows tickets as a surprise for their next date. When he never calls her, Michael berates the yoga instructor to Holly's pleasure, then offers to buy the tickets from her only to tear them up.

Phyllis takes over the Party Planning Committee by blackmailing Angela with her knowledge of Angela and Dwight's secret affair. After Angela shoots down all of Andy's wedding ideas, she warms up to him until he tells her that he booked his a cappella band 'Here Comes Treble' to play at their wedding (he states the members are Carl One, Carl Two, Broccoli Rob, Spare Rib, Doobie, Lunchbox, Boner Champ (Andy), Pubie Lewis and the News, Hopscotch, Jingle Jangle, and Sandwich).

Toby Flenderson (Paul Lieberstein) is briefly seen in a Costa Rican hospital due to a neck injury while zip-lining.

Production

"Weight Loss" was directed by Paul Feig and written by Lee Eisenberg and Gene Stupnitsky. Greg Daniels proposed the idea of Jim proposing to Pam in a gas station parking lot, as well as the decision to include the proposal in the season premiere episode - instead of during a season finale - to catch viewers off guard.

The proposal scene, which was filmed at a set built on an empty parking lot in Los Feliz, California, was the most expensive scene shot during the entire run of the show. The crew built a replica of an actual rest stop on the Merritt Parkway in Greenwich, Connecticut, that Daniels often visited as a child; the crew used Google Street View imagery to recreate the facade. The prop gas station building was large enough for background actors to move around, and a four-lane racetrack was built in front, where a team of 35 professional drivers drove cars and semi trucks at 55 miles per hour. Rainfall was created using rain machines, and an artificial "wooded" background was added in pre-production in place of the mountainous California backdrop.

Reception
In the 18–49 demographic, "Weight Loss" earned a 4.9/11 ratings share. The episode was watched by 9.1 million viewers.

The episode received critical acclaim, with praise mainly focusing on the episode's balance between comedy and character-driven moments, especially Jim's proposal to Pam. This scene ranked number 2 in phillyBurbs.com's top ten moments from the fifth season of The Office. Dwight and Angela carrying on their affair in the hidden corner of the warehouse during business hours ranked number 7 on that list. Writer Jen Weilgus described Dwight's line, "We done good in there, Half Pint," as the best quote of the season. Ryan's return as a temp in this episode, tied with his second return appearance in the episode "Dream Team", ranked number 5 in the list. Travis Fickett of IGN gave the episode a 9.2 of 10, indicating that it was "amazing". He wrote, "It's another terrific mix of character and comedy that is perfectly balanced," concluding that "The Office remains one of the funniest, best written, best performed and one of the best shows of TV. Period." Nathan Rabin, writing for The A.V. Club, graded the episode an "A−", giving particular praise to the development of the romance between Pam and Jim. "It was an episode full of big laughs and neat little character moments, as well as a number of gags rooted in camera placement. Ah, but I'm leaving out the big moment, that glorious milestone where years and years of flirtation, meaningful glances and missed chances finally paid off in a surprisingly satisfying, genuinely surprising beauty of a scene where Jim proposed to Pam outside a truck stop in the pouring rain."

Aubry Arminio of Entertainment Weekly also lauded the episode's more dramatic aspects over the comedic moments: "That’s what was so great about yesterday’s episode: I’ll admit I wasn’t rolling on the floor laughing, but I did find myself clutching my hand over my heart several times. Last night had those tender moments only The Office can pull off without seeming corny: Jim’s proposal in the rain in front of a rest stop, Michael pumping up Kelly’s self-esteem by having the staff point out her beauty (Creed: “Hell of an ass”), and Angela realizing that she's been terrible to Andy, then smooching in front of everyone." Oscar Dahl of BuddyTV lauded the episode, opining that it stayed true to the spirit of the show's previous four seasons. "The Office is the unique comedy in which characters evolve, story-lines take seasons to play out and the mythology is never dispensed at the expense of the humor.  Five season in, and tonight's premiere was every bit as funny as anything from the previous four.  It's a testament to the writers and the actors, and their continued focus on staying the course, sticking to what makes The Office perhaps the best and most consistent all-around comedy." Screen Junkies expressed hope for the season as a whole, stating "Everything that makes the show awesome is still there and firing on all cylinders, so I’m really looking forward to the rest of the season."

"Weight Loss" was voted the second highest-rated episode out of 26 from the fifth season, according to an episode poll at the fansite OfficeTally; the episode was rated 8.92 out of 10.

References

External links
"Weight Loss" at NBC.com

The Office (American season 5) episodes
2008 American television episodes
The Office (American TV series) episodes in multiple parts
Television episodes directed by Paul Feig